Badminton at the 2007 Pan American Games was played at the Riocentro Sports Complex, Pavilion 4B, in Rio de Janeiro, Brazil. The competition was held between July 14 and July 19.

Participating nations
A total of 14 nations entered players at badminton competition, with 40 men and 33 women.

Medal summary

Medal table

External links
Tournamentsoftware.com: 2007 Panamerican Games

 
Events at the 2007 Pan American Games
Badminton at the Pan American Games
2007
2007 in badminton